Jalal Chafai-Alaoui (born 22 January 1980) is a Moroccan former professional tennis player.

Chafai, an Arab world junior champion from Salé, spent his early career in the United States playing collegiate tennis for the Drury Panthers, who were coached by Moroccan Amine Boustani. After graduating in 2001 he competed on the professional tour and reached a best singles world ranking of 546, with an ITF Futures title win in Algeria in 2003. His career included an ATP Tour doubles main draw appearance at the 2002 Grand Prix Hassan II in Casablanca. He has also played professional tennis for the Springfield Lasers in the World TeamTennis competition. Returning to Drury to complete a Master's degree, Chafai served for a period as a tennis assistant coach for the college.

ITF Futures finals

Singles: 2 (1–1)

Doubles: 3 (1–2)

References

External links
 
 

1980 births
Living people
Moroccan male tennis players
Drury Panthers athletes
College men's tennis players in the United States
People from Salé